Prema Yuddham is a 1990 Telugu-language romance film produced by P. Vijaya Kumari under the Anupama Arts banner, directed by S. V. Rajendra Singh Babu. It stars Nagarjuna, Amala Akkineni with music composed by Hamsalekha. The film was simultaneously shot in Kannada as Bannada Gejje, with V. Ravichandran. The film was dubbed into Tamil as Idhaya Geetham and in Hindi as Prem Jung.

Cast
Nagarjuna
Amala Akkineni
Mohan Babu
Amjad Khan
Devaraj
Giri Babu
Vani Viswanath
Bharathi 
Dubbing Janaki

Soundtrack

Music composed by Hamsalekha. Music released on Lahari Audio Company.

References

1990s Telugu-language films
1990 films
Telugu remakes of Kannada films
Films scored by Hamsalekha
Films directed by Rajendra Singh Babu